The nucleus incertus is a region of the rodent pontine brainstem just ventral to the 4th ventricle. The term was coined by George Streeter (Latin for "uncertain nucleus") based on its unknown function at the time, to name a group of cells he observed near the midline of the floor of the 4th ventricle.

The nucleus incertus is a bilateral structure which sits near the brainstem, and is often also called 'nucleus O'. It consists of mostly ascending GABAergic projection neurons and glutamatergic neurons which innervate a broad range of forebrain regions involved in behavioural activation and the response to stress.

This tegmental nucleus is part of the theta network. The nucleus incertus is a relay from the reticularis pontis oralis nucleus to the septo-hippocampal system. The stimulation of the nucleus incertus activates the hippocampal theta rhythm and either its lesion or inhibition suppress the theta oscillation induced by brainstem stimulation. The nucleus incertus itself presents theta oscillations coupled to the hippocampal theta rhythm. In addition to hippocampal theta rhythms, a recent study in rodents implicates the nucleus incertus in the control of locomotor speed and arousal.

References 

Animal nervous system